Nancy Hanks Creek is a stream of the Buffalo Gap National Grassland in Jackson County, South Dakota, not far from Kadoka.

See also
List of rivers of South Dakota

References

Rivers of South Dakota
Rivers of Jackson County, South Dakota